Since the Egyptian revolution in 2011, officers and members of the Egyptian police have suffered targeted killings executed by extremist militant groups such as Ansar Bait al-Maqdis and other local criminals and unknown gunmen. As of December 2013, 500 policemen have been killed in attacks since 2011.

Casualties 
 Hamed Mohamed Sabry al-Far, killed on 28 January 2011.
 Mustafa Abdel-Moneim Abdel-Latif, killed on 28 January 2011 in Sinai.
 Mohamed Suleiman slama, killed on 30 January 2011.
 Mohamed Ali Abdul Aziz Mohammed, killed on 31 January 2011.
 Abdullah Mohamed al-Henawy, killed on 2 June 2011.
 Khaled Abdelkader Mohamed, killed on 2 June 2011.
 Hosny al-sayed Honsy, killed on 2 June 2011.
 Sameh Ibrahim Tahoun, killed on 1 June 2011.
 Abdel Nasser Mahmoud Ashour, killed on 29 May 2011.
 Hisham Refaat Husseini, killed on 4 May 2011.
 Ramadan Sayed Mohammed Abdel Latif, killed on 28 March 2011.
 Eid Mohammed Fathy Hassan, killed on 24 February 2011.
 Tareq Abu Saree' Ramadan Shaban, killed on 24 February 2011 in Sinai.
 Abdullah Hareedy Mohammed, killed on 17 February 2011.
 Mohammed Hosni Ibrahim Mohammed, killed on 22 June 2011 in Sinai.
 Amr Ibrahim Mohamed, killed on 21 November 2011 in Sinai.
 Hisham Safwat Abdel Aziz al-Mahdi, killed on 29 August 2011.
 Hassan Ibrahim Hassan, killed on 20 August 2011 in Sinai after being shot by Israeli helicopters.
 Ibrahim Abdullah Abdul Rahman Khalifa, killed on 4 June 2012 in Sinai.
 Mohamed Nassef, killed on 16 May 2012.
 Mahmoud Mohamed Sabry, killed on 2 May 2012 in Sinai.
 Mohammed Abdul Latif Abdul Jawad, killed on 15 April 2012 in Sinai.
 Mohamed Fawzy al-Saadany, killed on 15 April 2012 in Sinai.
 Mohammed Mosleh, killed on 15 April 2012 in Sinai.
 Nabil Omar Mohammed Omar, killed on 16 March 2012 in Sinai.
 Mahmoud Eid Mahmoud Ghoneim Ibrahim, killed on 4 February 2012.
 Al-Sayed Mohamed Abdel 'al Faraj, killed on 4 February 2012.

References

External links 
 WikiThawra

Egyptian revolution of 2011
Lists of police officers killed in the line of duty